The discography of T-Pain, an American rapper and singer, consists of six studio albums, one compilation album, one soundtrack album, one instrumental album, seven mixtapes, 21 singles and nineteen music videos.

On December 6, 2005, his debut studio album Rappa Ternt Sanga debuted at number 33 on the US Billboard 200. Both singles, "I'm Sprung" and "I'm 'n Luv (Wit a Stripper)", peaked in the top ten on the US Billboard Hot 100. After that, he collaborated with fellow rapper E-40 and singer Kandi Burruss on the single "U and Dat", which peaked at number 13 in the United States. In 2007, his second album, titled Epiphany (2007), debuted at number 1 in the United States. The lead single "Buy U a Drank (Shawty Snappin')" peaked at number 1 in the United States, the follow-up single "Bartender" peaked at number 5, and "Church" was released as the album's third single. During 2007, T-Pain made several guest appearances on songs by other performing artists, the most commercially successful of these being "Low" by Flo Rida, which peaked at number 1 in the United States and on several national singles charts worldwide.

In November 2008, T-Pain released his third studio album, Three Ringz which debuted at number 4 in the United States. Three singles were released from the album: "Chopped 'n' Skrewed", "Can't Believe It", and "Freeze". In 2008, T-Pain appeared on several other singles by other performing artists, including "Got Money" by Lil Wayne, "The Boss" by Rick Ross, and "One More Drink" by Ludacris. T-Pain's fourth studio album, Revolver, was released in December 2011. The album was preceded by the release of the promotional singles "Take Your Shirt Off", "Reverse Cowgirl", and "Rap Song", as well as the single "Booty Wurk (One Cheek at a Time)", which attained mixed success on worldwide charts. On May 4, 2011, T-Pain released a mixtape, PrEVOLVEr, in promotion of the album. The first official single from Revolver was "Best Love Song", which features Chris Brown. The album's second single was "5 O'Clock", which features Wiz Khalifa and Lily Allen. The album's third single was "Turn All the Lights On", which features Ne-Yo.

After years of scrapped singles and project name changes, T-Pain's fifth studio album Oblivion was released November 17, 2017.

Albums

Studio albums

Compilation albums

Soundtrack albums

Instrumental albums

Mixtapes

Singles

As lead artist 

Notes

As featured artist

Promotional singles

Other charted songs

Guest appearances

Music videos

As lead artist

Production discography

Notes 

 A  "Turn All the Lights On" did not enter the Billboard Hot 100, but peaked at number 13 on the Bubbling Under Hot 100 Singles chart, which acts as a 25-song extension to the Hot 100.
 B  "Ball Out ($500)" did not enter the Hot R&B/Hip-Hop Songs chart, but peaked at number 12 on the Bubbling Under R&B/Hip-Hop Singles chart, which acts as a 25-song extension to the Hot R&B/Hip-Hop Songs chart.
 C  "Cash Flow" did not enter the Billboard Hot 100, but peaked at number 20 on the Bubbling Under Hot 100 Singles chart, which acts as a 25-song extension to the Hot 100.
 D  Three single versions of "Cuddy Buddy" were released: the first features T-Pain, Lil Wayne and Twista; the second is identical to the first, but features Trey Songz in place of T-Pain; the third is identical to the second, but excludes Lil Wayne.
 E  "Download" did not enter the Billboard Hot 100, but peaked at number 9 on the Bubbling Under Hot 100 Singles chart, which acts as a 25-song extension to the Hot 100.
 F  "Overtime" did not enter the Billboard Hot 100, but peaked at number 19 on the Bubbling Under Hot 100 Singles chart, which acts as a 25-song extension to the Hot 100.
 G  "Money Round Here" did not enter the Hot R&B/Hip-Hop Songs chart, but peaked at number 2 on the Bubbling Under R&B/Hip-Hop Singles chart, which acts as a 25-song extension to the Hot R&B/Hip-Hop Songs chart.
 H  "Hey Baby (Drop It to the Floor)" did not enter the Hot R&B/Hip-Hop Songs chart, but peaked at number 15 on the Bubbling Under R&B/Hip-Hop Singles chart, which acts as a 25-song extension to the Hot R&B/Hip-Hop Songs chart.
 I  "Boom" did not enter the Hot R&B/Hip-Hop Songs chart, but peaked at number 4 on the Bubbling Under R&B/Hip-Hop Singles chart, which acts as a 25-song extension to the Hot R&B/Hip-Hop Songs chart.
 J  "Algo Me Gusta de Ti" did not enter the Billboard Hot 100, but peaked at number 10 on the Bubbling Under Hot 100 Singles chart, which acts as a 25-song extension to the Hot 100.

 K  "Holla Holla" did not enter the Billboard Hot 100, but peaked at number 19 on the Bubbling Under Hot 100 Singles chart, which acts as a 25-song extension to the Hot 100.
 L  "The Way You Move" did not enter the Billboard Hot 100, but peaked at number 19 on the Bubbling Under Hot 100 Singles chart, which acts as a 25-song extension to the Hot 100.
 M  "Studio Luv" did not enter the Hot R&B/Hip-Hop Songs chart, but peaked at number 15 on the Bubbling Under R&B/Hip-Hop Singles chart, which acts as a 25-song extension to the Hot R&B/Hip-Hop Songs chart.
 N  "Tipsy" did not enter the Hot R&B/Hip-Hop Songs chart, but peaked at number 8 on the Bubbling Under R&B/Hip-Hop Singles chart, which acts as a 25-song extension to the Hot R&B/Hip-Hop Songs chart.
 O  "Silver & Gold" did not enter the Hot R&B/Hip-Hop Songs chart, but peaked at number 8 on the Bubbling Under R&B/Hip-Hop Singles chart, which acts as a 25-song extension to the Hot R&B/Hip-Hop Songs chart.
 P  "Therapy" did not enter the Billboard Hot 100, but peaked at number 6 on the Bubbling Under Hot 100 Singles chart, which acts as a 25-song extension to the Hot 100.
 Q  "Headboard Pt. 2" did not enter the Hot R&B/Hip-Hop Songs chart, but peaked at number 19 on the Bubbling Under R&B/Hip-Hop Singles chart, which acts as a 25-song extension to the Hot R&B/Hip-Hop Songs chart.
 R  "Bang Bang Pow Pow" did not enter the Hot R&B/Hip-Hop Songs chart, but peaked at number 2 on the Bubbling Under R&B/Hip-Hop Singles chart, which acts as a 25-song extension to the Hot R&B/Hip-Hop Songs chart.
 S  "Look at Her Go" did not enter the Billboard Hot 100, but peaked at number 22 on the Bubbling Under Hot 100 Singles chart, which acts as a 25-song extension to the Hot 100.

References 

Discographies of American artists
Hip hop discographies
Rhythm and blues discographies
Pop music discographies
 
 
Songs written by T-Pain